Vrbovsko is a town in western Croatia, situated at the far east of the mountainous region of Gorski Kotar in the Primorje-Gorski Kotar County; on its 280 square kilometers area, Vrbovsko features 60 settlements and a total of 6,047 inhabitants. The town of Vrbovsko itself has a population of 1,673.

Demographics

In 2011, 60.1% of the population were Croats and 35.2% were Serbs.

The list of settlements in the municipality of Vrbovsko is:

 Blaževci, population 38
 Bunjevci, population 35
 Carevići, population 17
 Damalj, population 27
 Dokmanovići, population 54
 Dolenci, population 10
 Donji Vučkovići, population 17
 Donji Vukšići, population 13
 Draga Lukovdolska, population 19
 Dragovići, population 6
 Gomirje, population 343
 Gorenci, population 44
 Gornji Vučkovići, population 13
 Gornji Vukšići, population 0
 Hajdine, population 80
 Hambarište, population 38
 Jablan, population 209
 Jakšići, population 50
 Kamensko, population 4
 Klanac, population 35
 Komlenići, population 11
 Lesci, population 0
 Liplje, population 62
 Lukovdol, population 129
 Ljubošina, population 173
 Majer, population 16
 Mali Jadrč, population 35
 Matići, population 13
 Međedi, population 0
 Mlinari, population 7
 Močile, population 88
 Moravice, population 664
 Musulini, population 152
 Nadvučnik, population 29
 Nikšići, population 30
 Osojnik, population 102
 Petrovići, population 15
 Plemenitaš, population 38
 Plešivica, population 11
 Podvučnik, population 0
 Poljana, population 8
 Presika, population 14
 Radigojna, population 23
 Radočaj, population 0
 Radoševići, population 35
 Rim, population 38
 Rtić, population 11
 Severin na Kupi, population 118
 Smišljak, population 21
 Stubica, population 53
 Štefanci, population 3
 Tići, population 48
 Tomići, population 13
 Topolovica, population 3
 Tuk, population 79
 Veliki Jadrč, population 73
 Vrbovsko, population 1,673
 Vučinići, population 64
 Vučnik, population 11
 Vujnovići, population 41
 Vukelići, population 20
 Zapeć, population 9
 Zaumol, population 39
 Zdihovo, population 28
 Žakule, population 24

Geography

In the north, river Kupa separates Vrbovsko from adjoining Slovenia, while the eastern border follows the line of Zdihovo, Liplje and Bosiljevo settlements and cuts through the river Dobra valley near Ljubošina. The western border starts at the Kupa gorge at Radočaj, goes around Razdrto and passes over the railway tracks between Koritnik Veliki and Palež, continues to Lužac and ends in Sušica-Jablan area. The southern border is the highest in its relief characteristics – it runs along mountain peaks at an altitude of 1000 meters or higher. Debela Kosa (1169 m), Bukovica (1253 m), Bijela kosa (1289 m), Mirkovica (1283 m), and Smolnik (1219 m) peaks are especially distinguishable by their beauty, forests and height. Towards the east, the border continues over Kozarice and Lombarda passes, and ends in the river Dobra valley, thus rounding off Vrbovsko area.

The geographical position of Vrbovsko that places it along the transit lines halfway between Zagreb and Rijeka is of extreme importance. Good rail and highway connections provide for quick access to Vrbovsko.

References

External links

Populated places in Primorje-Gorski Kotar County
Modruš-Rijeka County
Cities and towns in Croatia